= Byeong Gi Lee =

South Korean electrical engineer

- Born: South Korea
- Education: Wireless communications
- Awards: IEEE Fellow; Member of Korean Academy of Engineering
- Scientific career
- Fields: Electrical Engineering; Telecommunications
- Workplaces: Seoul National University

Byeong Gi Lee is an emeritus professor at Seoul National University, South Korea.

== Early life ==
Born in Korea, Lee studied his undergraduate degree at Seoul National University, Korea. He received his Ph.D. degree in electrical engineering from UCLA, USA.

== Career ==
Lee worked at Granger Associates and AT&T Bell Labs before joining SNU, Korea as a faculty member. He became a professor of electrical engineering and subsequently Vice Chancellor of Research. Later, he became a Commissioner of the Korean Communications Commission. He was active in IEEE Communications Society and had served as the society President. He was also the 23rd President of KICS - Korean Information and Communications Society. Lee later retired in 2016 as an emeritus professor of SNU.

== Awards ==
Lee was elected to Fellow of the IEEE in the year 1997 for contributions to digital transform and filtering, to broadband telecommunications, and to digital scrambling and member of Korean National Academy of Engineering.
